The discography of Nadia Ali, a Pakistani American singer-songwriter, consists of two studio albums, three remix albums, thirty-six singles (including fifteen as a featured artist) and fourteen music videos. Ali began her career in 2001 as the frontwoman of New York-based house music act iiO, whose debut single "Rapture" reached number two on the UK Singles Chart and Billboard Hot Dance Club Play Chart and charted in several other countries. While with iiO, she released the 2005 studio album Poetica, which reached number 17 on Billboard Dance/Electronic Albums chart. Apart from "Rapture", the album produced five other singles including the Billboard Hot Dance Club Play number one single "Is It Love?". Ali left iiO in 2005, while the band continued to release material featuring her on vocals, most notably the 2011 studio album Exit 110.

Ali began her solo career in 2006 with a collaboration with Dutch DJ Armin van Buuren, appearing on his single "Who is Watching?", which reached number 19 in Finland. She released her debut solo album Embers in 2009, which was praised for her songwriting and the blend of electronic, acoustic and Eastern music. The album spawned four singles, which included the Billboard Hot Dance Club Play chart-topper "Love Story", the top-ten "Fine Print" and "Crash and Burn" and the Grammy-nominated "Fantasy". She was also featured on Tocadisco's single "Better Run", which peaked at number 15 in Belgium.

In 2010, Ali released a remix album series titled Queen of Clubs Trilogy consisting of three albums, Ruby Edition (August 2010), Onyx Edition (October 2010) and Diamond Edition (December 2010). The trilogy produced one single: the re-released "Rapture", which charted in several countries in Europe and reached number three in Romania. Ali's first release in 2011 was the single "Call My Name" with Sultan and Ned Shepard; the track was a club success peaking at number five on Billboard Hot Dance Club Play Chart. Her second release was the track "Pressure", which became a club and festival anthem in summer 2011, while also charting in Belgium and Netherlands. As of 2018, she has been working under the project HYLLS, releasing a new song every month culminating with the studio album Once in 2019.

Albums

Studio albums

Remix albums

Singles

As Nadia Ali

As Hylls

As featured artist

Music videos

Other appearances
The following songs are not (official or promotional) singles and have not appeared on an album by Ali:

Writing credits

These songs were written by Ali and performed by other artists only and have not appeared on a studio album by Ali:

Notes
A. "Roxanne", originally performed by The Police in 1978, was re-recorded by Ali and released as a free download.
B.  Co-written with Bethany Cosentino

References

External links
Official Website

Discographies of American artists
Discographies of Pakistani artists
Electronic music discographies
House music discographies